
Gmina Kamień is a rural gmina (administrative district) in Rzeszów County, Subcarpathian Voivodeship, in south-eastern Poland.

Villages
The gmina contains the villages of Kamień (divided into several sołectwos), Krzywa Wieś and Łowisko.

Neighbouring gminas
Gmina Kamień is bordered by the gminas of Jeżowe, Nowa Sarzyna, Raniżów and Sokołów Małopolski.

References
Polish official population figures 2006

Kamien
Rzeszów County